The following list sorts sovereign states and dependent territories and by the total number of births. Figures are from the 2022 revision of the United Nations World Population Prospects report, for the calendar year 2021.

List of countries by number of births

Countries and dependent territories by the number of births in 2021 according to the World Population Prospects 2022 of the United Nations Department of Economic and Social Affairs.

See also
Total fertility rate
List of sovereign states and dependencies by total fertility rate
List of sovereign states and dependent territories by birth rate
List of countries by number of deaths
List of people with the most children
List of population concern organizations
Population growth
Sub-replacement fertility
Fertility and intelligence

References

External links 
United Nations, Department of Economic and Social Affairs - Population Division - World Population Prospects, the 2022 Revision

Births
Births
Demographic economics
Human geography
Fertility
+